Niemira is a surname as well as the feminine variant of the name Niemir. Notable people with the surname include:

Karol Niemira (1881–1965), Polish Roman Catholic priest 
Stanisław Niemira (1597–1648), Polish-Lithuanian Commonwealth noble and politician

Polish-language surnames